The Church of Jesus Christ–Christian is an American Christian Identity, white supremacist church, which was founded in 1946 by Ku Klux Klan organizer Wesley A. Swift. Swift was the son of a Methodist Episcopal Church, South  minister and is considered a significant figure in the early years of the Christian Identity movement in the United States. Swift's work and copyrights are carried on by Kingdom Identity Ministries.

History
The church was originally known as the White Identity Church of Jesus Christ–Christian, assuming its present name in 1957. After Wesley Swift's death in 1970, the ministry was continued by his wife Lorraine Swift. Roy Gillaspie and Arnold Murray were in leadership positions between 1950 and the 1970s.

In February 2001, the names Church of Jesus Christ–Christian and Aryan Nations were transferred to Victoria and Jason Keenan when the Keenans won a US $6.3 million lawsuit against the organizations after being attacked by Aryan Nations paramilitary soldiers; the Aryan Nations compound was also transferred to the Keenans. In March 2001, the Keenans sold the compound to the Cambridge, Massachusetts-based Carr Foundation, a human rights organization which plans to build a human rights center on the property.

The church resurfaced in August 2009, five years after the death of Richard Butler, who resumed the ministry after the death of Swift. The church is now headed by a council of three men, including Senior Pastor Paul R. Mullet.

References

Further reading
On the Edge: Political Cults Right and Left by Dennis Tourish, and Tim Wohlforth, 2000.

Christian denominations established in the 20th century
Aryan Nations
Christian organizations established in 1946
Ku Klux Klan organizations